

Hanns Laengenfelder (8 February 1903 – 18 July 1982) was a German general (Generalmajor) in the Wehrmacht during World War II who commanded the 15th Infantry Division.  He was a recipient of the Knight's Cross of the Iron Cross with Oak Leaves of Nazi Germany. Laengenfelder surrendered to the Soviet forces in May 1945 and was held in the Soviet Union as a war criminal until 1955.

Awards and decorations
 Iron Cross (1939) 2nd Class (17 September 1939) & 1st Class (1 November 1939)
 Knight's Cross of the Iron Cross with Oak Leaves
 Knight's Cross on 21 October 1943 as Oberstleutnant and commander of Grenadier-Regiment 106
 Nominated for Oak Leaves in 1945

References

Citations

Bibliography

 
 
 

1903 births
1982 deaths
Military personnel from Nuremberg
People from the Kingdom of Bavaria
Major generals of the German Army (Wehrmacht)
Recipients of the Knight's Cross of the Iron Cross with Oak Leaves
German prisoners of war in World War II held by the Soviet Union